Akhon Samoy is a Bengali-language newspaper published from New York, United States since 2000.

History 
The newspaper was founded on 1 January 2000, commemorating the 3rd millennium. Initially it was a monthly newspaper and then it was published in weekly basis from November 2000.

Kazi Shamsul Hoque is the founding editor of the newspaper.

Speciality and awards 
Akhon Samoy worked for the expatriate Bangladeshi living in United States, especially, social issues, immigration issues and other community news are published objectively.

See also 
 List of New York City newspapers and magazines
 List of newspapers in New York

References

External links 
 
 
 

2000 establishments in New York City
Newspapers established in 2000
Bengali-language newspapers
Non-English-language newspapers published in the United States
Newspapers published in New York City
Non-English-language newspapers published in New York (state)
Bangladeshi-American culture
Indian-American culture in New York City